1704 Wachmann, provisional designation , is a stony asteroid from the inner regions of the asteroid belt, approximately 7 kilometers in diameter. It was discovered by German astronomer Karl Reinmuth at Heidelberg Observatory on 7 March 1924. It was later named after astronomer Arno Wachmann.

Classification and orbit 

The S-type asteroid orbits the Sun in the inner main-belt at a distance of 2.0–2.4 AU once every 3 years and 4 months (1,210 days). Its orbit has an eccentricity of 0.09 and an inclination of 1° with respect to the ecliptic. No precoveries were taken. The asteroid's observation arc begins 3 days after its official discovery observation.

Physical characteristics

Lightcurves 

In April 2007, a rotational lightcurve Wachmann was obtained at the U.S. Sandia View Observatory in New Mexico. Lightcurve analysis gave a well-defined rotation period of  hours with a brightness variation of 0.40 magnitude.

Diameter and albedo 

According to the survey carried out by the NEOWISE mission of NASA's Wide-field Infrared Survey Explorer, Wachmann measures 6.6 and 6.9 kilometers in diameter, and its surface has an albedo of 0.177 and 0.193, respectively, while the Collaborative Asteroid Lightcurve Link assumes a standard albedo for stony asteroids of 0.20 and calculates a diameter of 7.8 kilometers, based on an absolute magnitude of 12.9.

Naming 

This minor planet was named for Arno Wachmann (1902–1990), long-time astronomer at the Bergedorf Observatory in Hamburg, discoverer of minor planets and comets, and observer of variable and binary stars. He is best known for the co-discovery of the three "Schwassmann–Wachmann" comets, 29P, 31P and 73P. The official  was published by the Minor Planet Center on 20 February 1976.

References

External links 
 Asteroid Lightcurve Database (LCDB), query form (info )
 Dictionary of Minor Planet Names, Google books
 Asteroids and comets rotation curves, CdR – Observatoire de Genève, Raoul Behrend
 Discovery Circumstances: Numbered Minor Planets (1)-(5000) – Minor Planet Center
 
 

001704
Discoveries by Karl Wilhelm Reinmuth
Named minor planets
19240307